HD 221246 or NGC 7686 1 is a star in open cluster NGC 7686, and it belongs to the northern constellation of Andromeda. With an apparent visual magnitude of 6.17, it can be viewed by the naked eye only under very favourable conditions. It has a spectral classification of K3III, meaning it is an evolved orange giant star. Parallax measurements place this star about 1,000 light years away from the solar system.

References

External links
 Image NGC 7686 1

Andromeda (constellation)
221246
NGC 7686
K-type giants
8925
115996
Durchmusterung objects